Ana María López Colomé is a distinguished Mexican biochemist who won the 2002 L'Oréal-UNESCO Award for Women in Science – Latin America for her studies on the human retina and the prevention of retinitis pigmentosa and several retinopathies.

López Colomé is a former head of the Department of Biochemistry at the Faculty of Medicine and a researcher at the Institute of Cellular Physiology of the National Autonomous University of Mexico (UNAM). She holds a bachelor's degree in biology, a master's degree in chemistry and a doctorate degree in biochemistry.

Awards and honors 
 SNI Nivel III (This award is given by Mexico's National Science Foundation based on a person's publication record and impact.)
 “Mexicanos Notables”. Canal 11. 2009 (This award is given by Mexico's state funded TV channel 11 and is given only to noteworthy Mexicans.)
 Award Ciudad Capital: Heberto Castillo Martínez. Denominación “Thalía Harmony Baillet”, in the area of health. 2008
 Distinción “Mujer Líder 2008”. Consorcio “Mundo Ejecutivo” (Empresarial). 2008
 “Sor Juana Inés de la Cruz” Award UNAM. 2006 (This award is given only to one woman in each school of UNAM and is a prestigious award to recognize women leaders in the university.)
 UNAM Award, Research in Natural Sciences, 2002
 “Mujer del Año” (Woman of the Year). Patronato Nacional de La Mujer del Año, 2002
 Recognized as the Smartest Woman of Mexico with the  “Laureana Wright Award given by the Mexican Society in Geography and Statistics. 2003
 Award for conducting the best basic research in her first University year. Mexico's National Academy of Medicine, 2003
 Recognized as the Woman of the Year by the Rotary Club of the Pedregal, 2003
 “Hartley” Award. University of Southampton, UK, 1985
 “Gabino Barreda” Award 1985. UNAM (This prestigious award is given to the student with the highest GPA of each generation at UNAM).

References

Year of birth missing (living people)
Living people
Mexican biochemists
Women biochemists
Mexican women chemists
Academic staff of the National Autonomous University of Mexico
Mexican women scientists
L'Oréal-UNESCO Awards for Women in Science laureates
21st-century Mexican women scientists
21st-century Mexican scientists
20th-century Mexican scientists
20th-century Mexican women scientists